The 1994 Lower Saxony state election was held on 13 March 1994 to elect the members of the 13th Landtag of Lower Saxony. The incumbent government was a coalition of the Social Democratic Party (SPD) and The Greens led by Minister-President Gerhard Schröder. As the SPD won an absolute majority of seats in the election, it formed government alone, and Schröder continued in office.

Parties
The table below lists parties represented in the 12th Landtag of Lower Saxony.

Election result

|-
! colspan="2" | Party
! Votes
! %
! +/-
! Seats 
! +/-
! Seats %
|-
| bgcolor=| 
| align=left | Social Democratic Party (SPD)
| align=right| 1,880,623
| align=right| 44.3
| align=right| 0.1
| align=right| 81
| align=right| 10
| align=right| 50.3
|-
| bgcolor=| 
| align=left | Christian Democratic Union (CDU)
| align=right| 1,547,510
| align=right| 36.2
| align=right| 5.6
| align=right| 67
| align=right| ±0
| align=right| 41.6
|-
| bgcolor=| 
| align=left | Alliance 90/The Greens (Grüne)
| align=right| 314,344
| align=right| 7.4
| align=right| 1.9
| align=right| 13
| align=right| 5
| align=right| 8.1
|-
! colspan=8|
|-
| bgcolor=| 
| align=left | Free Democratic Party (FDP)
| align=right| 188,691
| align=right| 4.4
| align=right| 1.6
| align=right| 0
| align=right| 9
| align=right| 0
|-
| bgcolor=|
| align=left | The Republicans (REP)
| align=right| 159,026
| align=right| 3.7
| align=right| 2.2
| align=right| 0
| align=right| ±0
| align=right| 0
|-
| bgcolor=#00008B|
| align=left | Statt Party (STATT)
| align=right| 55,605
| align=right| 1.3
| align=right| 1.3
| align=right| 0
| align=right| ±0
| align=right| 0
|-
| bgcolor=|
| align=left | Others
| align=right| 103,122
| align=right| 2.4
| align=right| 
| align=right| 0
| align=right| ±0
| align=right| 0
|-
! align=right colspan=2| Total
! align=right| 4,249,021
! align=right| 100.0
! align=right| 
! align=right| 161
! align=right| 6
! align=right| 
|-
! align=right colspan=2| Voter turnout
! align=right| 
! align=right| 73.8
! align=right| 0.8
! align=right| 
! align=right| 
! align=right| 
|}

Sources
 Landtagswahlen in Niedersachsen

1994
Lower Saxony
March 1994 events in Europe